Les Fourmis (The Ants) trilogy is a three-part novel series by French novelist Bernard Werber.

The novels
Les Fourmis, Prix des lecteurs de Science et Avenir, 1991, . (lit. The Ants, translated into English as Empire of the Ants). This book sold more than two million copies and has been translated into more than 30 languages. 
Le Jour Des Fourmis, 1992,  (lit. The Day of the Ants)
La Révolution Des Fourmis, 1996,  (lit. The Revolution of the Ants)

See also
Boris Vian, author of short story "Les Fourmis"

Fictional ants
Novels by Bernard Werber
Science fiction novel trilogies

fr:Les Fourmis (Werber)
ko:개미 (소설)